Jesseca Faye Harris-Dupart (born February 12, 1982) is an American entrepreneur and the founder and chief executive officer of Kaleidoscope Hair Products. She was born and raised in New Orleans, Louisiana and founded Kaleidoscope Hair Studio in 2013 in New Orleans as a single mother. Her salon burned down in December 2013 and she reopened it in July 2014 and introduced the Kaleidoscope Hair Products. In 2018, Kaleidoscope sales went from $100,000 a month at the start of the year to $1 million by the end of March.

In 2019 she was awarded the Key to the City of New Orleans by the mayor of New Orleans, LaToya Cantrell, to recognize the philanthropy and business she has contributed to in the area.

Personal life 
She is African-American and has three children. In March 2020, musician Da Brat announced that she was in a relationship with Dupart. On February 22, 2022, the pair married in Georgia.

Filmography

Television

References 

African-American company founders
American company founders
American women company founders
African-American women in business
Businesspeople from New Orleans
LGBT African Americans
American LGBT businesspeople
Living people
1982 births
21st-century African-American people
20th-century African-American people
20th-century African-American women
21st-century African-American women